Hagsta is a village situated in Gävle Municipality, Gävleborg County, Sweden with 200 inhabitants in 2005.

References 

Populated places in Gävle Municipality
Gästrikland